The Honduran National Athletics Federation (FENHATLE; Federación Nacional Hondureña de Atletismo) is the governing body for the sport of athletics in Honduras.  Current president is Calixto Sierra.  He was re-elected for the period 2012-2014 in May 2012.

History 
FENHATLE was founded in 1951.

Affiliations 
FENHATLE is the national member federation for Honduras in the following international organisations:
World Athletics
North American, Central American and Caribbean Athletic Association (NACAC)
Association of Panamerican Athletics (APA)
Asociación Iberoamericana de Atletismo (AIA; Ibero-American Athletics Association)
Central American and Caribbean Athletic Confederation (CACAC)
Confederación Atlética del Istmo Centroamericano (CADICA; Central American Isthmus Athletic Confederation)
Moreover, it is part of the following national organisations:
Honduran Olympic Committee (COH; Spanish: Comité Olímpico Hondureño)

National records 
FENHATLE maintains the Honduran records in athletics.

External links 
FENHATLE on Facebook (in Spanish)

References 

Honduras
Athletics
Athletics in Honduras
National governing bodies for athletics
Sports organizations established in 1951
1951 establishments in Honduras